Plattsville may refer to:

Plattsville, Ontario, Canada
Plattsville (Lubitz Flying Field) Aerodrome, an aerodrome located east of Plattsville, Ontario, Canada
Plattsville, Connecticut, a census-designated place
Plattsville, Ohio, an unincorporated community